Arn  may refer to:

People

Given name
 Arn Anderson (born 1958), American professional wrestler
 Arn Menconi (born 1959), District 2 Commissioner in Eagle County, Colorado
 Arn Saba (born 1947), Canadian cartoonist, writer, media personality, stage performer and composer
 Arn of Salzburg (c. 750–821), Bishop of Salzburg and afterwards its first archbishop  
 Arn Tellem (born 1954), American sports executive and player agent
  Arn von Endsee (died 892), Bishop of Würzburg from 855 until his death in 892

Surname
 Edward F. Arn (1906–1998), governor of the U.S. state of Kansas
 Gréta Arn (born 1979), Hungarian professional tennis player

Fictional characters
 Arn, the protagonist's friend in Hal Foster's Prince Valiant comic strip, and Valiant's first son, named after the friend
 Arn Magnusson, the fictional main character in the Crusades trilogy (1998-2000) by Swedish author Jan Guillou, as well as the film adaptation Arn: The Knight Templar (2007) based on the first two books of the trilogy

Others
 Arn., taxonomic author abbreviation of George Arnott Walker-Arnott (1799–1868), Scottish botanist
 Arn, an alien species in the Animorphs series by  K. A. Applegate, featured in the books The Hork-Bajir Chronicles (1998) and The Prophecy (1999)

Abbreviation
 arn, the ISO 639-2 code for the Mapudungun language, a language isolate spoken in central Chile and west central Argentina
 George Arnott Walker-Arnott, a Scottish botanist, known by the author abbreviation "Arn."

ARN
ARN may refer to:
 Stockholm Arlanda Airport, an international airport located in Sigtuna Municipality, Sweden (IATA airport code)
 ARN (railway station),  a railway station that serves the village of Arnside in Cumbria, England
 Alberta RailNet
 Aircraft registration number
 Arkansas Radio Network, a  United States regional radio network
 Australian Radio Network, a free-to-air commercial radio network
 Access Research Network
 ARNnet, IDG Australian brand
 Allmänna reklamationsnämnden
 Accelerated Return Note (ARN)
 Amazon Resource Name, a term used in Amazon Web Services
 Acute retinal necrosis

See also
 Aarne, a surname
 Arne (disambiguation)